Jezierzyce may refer to the following places:
Jezierzyce, Greater Poland Voivodeship (west-central Poland)
Jezierzyce, Pomeranian Voivodeship (north Poland)
Jezierzyce, Warmian-Masurian Voivodeship (north Poland)
Jezierzyce, Myślibórz County in West Pomeranian Voivodeship (north-west Poland)
Jezierzyce, Świdwin County in West Pomeranian Voivodeship (north-west Poland)
Jezierzyce, Szczecin